Todor Marev (Bulgarian: Тодор Марев), (born on 20 November 1954) is a former Bulgarian footballer. He played in the center of the defence for Cherno More Varna (1972-1990, 1994), Dorostol Silistra and Ovech Provadia (1990-1993). Marev was capped 16 times for the Bulgarian National team, 6 times for the Olympic team and 26 times for the U18 team of his country, with which he won the Balkan championship cup played in Thessaloniki in 1969. Todor Marev was voted Best player of Varna in 3 consecutive years (1976, 1977, 1978).

Club career
Marev was born in Burgas but he grew up and spent all his life in Varna.  He went through all youth formations of Cherno More and is considered one of the greatest talents the club has ever raised. He was introduced to Group A football by coaches Ivan Mokanov and Georgi Dimitrov, making his debut at the age of 17, on 4 June 1972 in a match against Dunav Ruse. He established himself as a leader at the center of the defence becoming one of the youngest skippers in Group A football aged only 22. Marev was known for his faultless tackles, positioning abilities and speed. Under his leadership the Cherno More defence was one of the hardest to beat in Group A. Only ones in his career, Marev was red carded. It was in the last minutes of one of his last competitive games on 6 April 1994 in a brusque Varna derby which saw a total of 4 players sent off.  Marev took little to no part in the attacking phase of the game. He scored only 2 goals in his career, the first and most memorable one coming against local rivals Spartak on 29 September 1985, sealing a 3-0 victory for “The Sailors”. Todor Marev played a total of 530 matches for Cherno More (422 in Group A and 108 in Group B) which is a record in Bulgarian football. He played 3 seasons in the lower divisions for Dorostol Silistra and Ovech Provadia before making a brief return to Cherno More as a playing assistant coach under manager Stefan Bogomilov in the spring of 1994. On 13 August 1994, at the age of 39, he put an end to his playing career.

International career
Todor Marev was selected for the Bulgarian A team by manager Stoyan Ormandzhiev and made his debut in Genoa on 22 December 1974 in a friendly against Italy (0-0). He made a total of 16 appearances, the last one being a match against Switzerland, played in Varna on 9 March 1983 (1-1).

Coaching career
Marev graduated from the University of Economics (Varna) in 1983 and also took a course in the National Sports academy (Sofia), receiving a coaching degree in 1995. He coached the female football side of Grand hotel Varna to 3 successive National championship titles after which he dedicated his coaching career to the youth teams of Cherno More. For a brief period in 1998, Marev took charge of the first team when the club was in deep trouble facing relegation to 3d division (Group “V”). From the following season to date, Marev works as a coach with the Cherno More youth academy.

References
 
 
 a-pfg.com
 a-pfg.com
 Ст. Янев, П. Герчев, Д. Димитров, В. Свраков, "Футболна Варна", издание "Георги Бакалов", Варна, 1988 г.
 chernomorepfc.bg

External links

1954 births
Living people
Bulgarian footballers
Bulgaria international footballers
PFC Cherno More Varna players
First Professional Football League (Bulgaria) players
Second Professional Football League (Bulgaria) players
Bulgarian football managers
PFC Cherno More Varna managers
Sportspeople from Varna, Bulgaria
Association football defenders